Perth Township is a civil township in Walsh County, North Dakota, United States. The population was 63 at the 2000 census.

It is not to be confused with Perth, North Dakota, population 9, located at 

The township was named after Perth, Scotland.

References

Townships in Walsh County, North Dakota
Townships in North Dakota